Kimberly Kim (born August 23, 1991) is an American professional golfer who plays on the LPGA Tour.

Amateur career
Kim was born in Hilo, Hawaii. She attended the University of Denver in 2009–10, leading the team with a 73.67 scoring average and winning the 2009-10 SBC Golf Tournament.

At age 14, she became the youngest player to win the U.S. Women's Amateur in 2006. She finished runner-up at the 2006 and 2009 U.S. Women's Amateur Public Links and the 2009 U.S. Girls' Junior.

Professional career
Kim turned professional in July 2010, after finishing tied for 14th at the LPGA Final Qualifying Tournament to earn Priority List Category 11 for the 2011 LPGA season on her first attempt.

U.S. national team appearances
Amateur
Junior Solheim Cup: 2005 (winners), 2007
Espirito Santo Trophy: 2006
Curtis Cup: 2008 (winners), 2010 (winners)

References

External links

Kimberly Kim at Seoul Sisters

American female golfers
LPGA Tour golfers
Winners of ladies' major amateur golf championships
Golfers from Hawaii
Golfers from Colorado
University of Denver alumni
American sportspeople of Korean descent
People from Hilo, Hawaii
Sportspeople from Pueblo, Colorado
1991 births
Living people
21st-century American women